Kid A Mnesia is a reissue compiling the albums Kid A (2000) and Amnesiac (2001) by the English rock band Radiohead. It also includes a bonus disc, Kid Amnesiae, comprising previously unreleased material. It was released on 5 November 2021 on XL Recordings. 

Kid A Mnesia was promoted with a campaign on the social network TikTok, followed by singles and music videos for the previously unreleased tracks "If You Say the Word" and "Follow Me Around". It was released to acclaim, though reaction to the bonus material was mixed. It entered the top 10 of several national album charts, and topped the UK Independent Albums Chart and the US Billboard Top Alternative Albums and Top Rock Albums charts. 

Kid A Mnesia Exhibition, an interactive experience with music and artwork from the albums, was released in the same month for PlayStation 5, macOS and Windows.

Background 

Radiohead and their producer Nigel Godrich recorded Kid A and Amnesiac simultaneously in 1999 and 2000 in studios in Paris, Copenhagen, Gloucester and Oxford. Departing from Radiohead's earlier guitar-led sound, the albums featured more diverse instrumentation, including the ondes Martenot, programmed electronic beats, strings, and jazz horns. Radiohead considered releasing the work as a double album, but felt the material was too dense.

The albums divided fans and critics, but later attracted acclaim. At the turn of the decade, Rolling Stone, Pitchfork and the Times ranked Kid A the greatest album of the 2000s. Kid A was ranked at number 20 in the 2020 edition of Rolling Stone's "500 Greatest Albums of All Time" list, and Amnesiac at number 320 in the 2012 edition.

Content 
Kid A Mnesia contains the albums Kid A and Amnesiac, plus a third disc, Kid Amnesiae, comprising previously unreleased material from the Kid A and Amnesiac recording sessions. The albums are not remastered. The "deluxe" edition also contains an art book and Kid Amnesiette, a cassette edition with five B-sides.

"Like Spinning Plates ('Why Us?' Version)" is a piano arrangement of the electronic song "Like Spinning Plates". "If You Say the Word" features "delicate" fingerpicking, a "foreboding groove", "chiming" percussion and ondes Martenot. "Follow Me Around" is a solo acoustic guitar performance by Thom Yorke, with a "soaring" chorus and references to Margaret Thatcher. "Pulk/Pull (True Love Waits Version)" is a "harsh, industrial" version of another song, "True Love Waits", with elements of the Amnesiac track "Pulk/Pull Revolving Doors". Kid Amnesiae also includes alternative versions of "Morning Bell" and the B-sides "Fog" and "Fast-Track", and isolated string tracks from "How to Disappear Completely" and "Pyramid Song".

Promotion and release 
On 1 April 2021, Radiohead joined the social media platform TikTok and began posting short videos featuring their character Chieftain Mews. Over the course of several months, they posted more than 30 videos. In early September, Radiohead posted a comedic video in which Yorke and Radiohead's cover artist Stanley Donwood discussed the channel's declining engagement.

Radiohead announced Kid A Mnesia on 7 September 2021, and released a digital single, the previously unreleased track "If You Say the Word". A music video for "If You Say the Word" was released on 23 September; directed by Kasper Häggström, it follows two men who capture people in the forest and bring them to London to become office workers. "Follow Me Around" was released on 1 November, with a music video starring Guy Pearce as a man avoiding a drone following him in his home. Radiohead released Kid A Mnesia merchandise including a bone china tea set, and Yorke and Donwood produced two art books detailing the creative process of the albums. In October 2021, Donwood and Yorke curated an exhibition of Kid A artwork at Christie's headquarters in London.

Kid A Mnesia was released in vinyl, CD, cassette and digital versions. It reached number one on the UK Independent Albums Chart, number one the American Billboard Top Alternative Albums and Top Rock Albums charts, and the top ten of several other national charts.

Kid A Mnesia Exhibition 

Radiohead planned to create an art installation based on the albums, but this was canceled due to logistical problems and the COVID-19 pandemic. Instead, a digital experience, Kid A Mnesia Exhibition, was released in November as a free download for PlayStation 5, macOS and Windows. It was developed over two years by Radiohead with Namethemachine, Arbitrarily Good Productions and Epic Games. It received positive reviews, with critics praising its intersection of music, art and technology.

Reception 

On the review aggregator website Metacritic, Kid A Mnesia has a score of 97 out of 100 based on 10 reviews, indicating "universal acclaim". Mojo critic noted the influence of Kid A and Amnesiac on subsequent acts that had blended rock and electronic music. 

The Kid Amnesiae bonus disc drew praise. In the Times, Jonathan Dean said it was the reissue's "real gem"; he praised the "stunning" alternative version of "Like Spinning Plates", saying it demonstrated "a band hellbent on challenging what people thought they were", and "Follow Me Around", describing it as "a brilliant song made at the wrong time, by a band who had moved on". The NME critic Andrew Trendell wrote that the bonus disc "feels like as much a complete album as you could hope for ... [It] not only offers a mood piece, but also a companion and secret history behind the making of two essential, landmark records." In The Guardian, Phil Mongredien praised it as "a fascinating companion piece for two classic albums".

The Pitchfork critic Jayson Greene found that Kid Amnesiae lacked the "revelatory quality" of the bonus material included in Radiohead's 2017 OK Computer reissue OKNOTOK 1997 2017, with no "bolt-from-the-blue alternate history that redefines our understanding of the band". The Paste critic Saby Reyes-Kulkarni found the reissue disappointing, with "an assortment of half-baked leftovers".

Track listing

Notes 
 "Idioteque" contains two samples from the Odyssey record First Recordings – Electronic Music Winners (1976): Paul Lansky's "Mild und Leise" and Arthur Kreiger's "Short Piece".

Personnel

Radiohead
 Colin Greenwood
 Jonny Greenwood
 Ed O'Brien
 Philip Selway
 Thom Yorke

Additional musicians

 Orchestra of St John's – strings
 John Lubbock – conducting
 Jonny Greenwood – scoring
 Horns on "The National Anthem"
 Andy Bush – trumpet
 Steve Hamilton – alto saxophone 
 Martin Hathaway – alto saxophone 
 Andy Hamilton – tenor saxophone
 Mark Lockheart – tenor saxophone
 Stan Harrison – baritone saxophone
 Liam Kerkman – trombone
 Mike Kearsey – bass trombone
 Henry Binns – rhythm sampling on "The National Anthem"
 The Humphrey Lyttelton Band 
 Humphrey Lyttelton – trumpet, bandleader
 Jimmy Hastings – clarinet
 Pete Strange – trombone
 Paul Bridge – double bass
 Adrian Macintosh – drums

Technical personnel
 Nigel Godrich – production, engineering, mixing
 Radiohead – production
 Dan Grech-Marguerat – engineering 
 Chris Blair – mastering 
 Bob Ludwig – mastering 
 Gerard Navarro – production assistance, engineering assistance
 Graeme Stewart – engineering assistance

Artwork
 Stanley Donwood – pictures, design 
 Tchocky – pictures

Charts

References

2021 albums
Radiohead albums
Albums produced by Nigel Godrich
Electronic albums by English artists
Reissue albums